General Chang  may refer to:
Chang Che-ping (born 1958), general of the Republic of China Air Force
Chang Do-yong (1923–2012), general of the Republic of Korea Army, nominal leader of South Korea's May 16 coup
Chang Fa-kuei (1896–1980), general of the Republic of China
Chang Guan-chung (born 1959), general of the Republic of China Army
Chang Hai-peng (1867–1949), general of the Republic of China who defected to Manchukuo
Chang Sung-hwan (1920–2015), lieutenant general of the Republic of Korea Air Force
Chang Tsung-chang (1881–1932), Shandong-based general of the Fengtian Clique during the early Republic of China era
Chang Yinhuai (died 1929), Heilongjiang-based general of the Fengtian Clique during the early Republic of China era
Chang Yuchun (1330–1369), general of the Ming Dynasty
Chang (Star Trek), primary antagonist in the 1991 American film Star Trek VI